Păunescu is a Romanian surname that may refer to:

Adrian Păunescu (1943 – 2010), poet, journalist, and politician.
Gheorghe Păunescu (1948 – ), gymnast.
Marcela Păunescu (1955 – ), gymnast.
Oprea Păunescu (1936 – ), rower.

Romanian-language surnames